M/T Irene SL is a Greek-owned and -operated VLCC (Very Large Crude Carrier) or supertanker.   It was pirated presumably by Somali pirates on February 9, 2011 approximately 350 miles Southeast of Muscat, Oman in the Arabian Sea.

Built in 2004, the Irene SL has a gross tonnage of 161,175 GT with a displacement of 319,247 DWT. The vessel has a single deck and is double-hulled. Her sister ship is the 2005-built .

When captured the ship was en route from Fujairah to the United States loaded with 2 million barrels of crude oil with an estimated value of $200 million.
With the use of larger mother ships since the end of 2010, pirates have extended their operational capabilities.

Three other VLCCs that have been ransomed by pirates are the Sirius Star, the Maran Centaurus, and the Samho Dream.

See also
List of ships attacked by Somali pirates in 2011

References

External links
MVIrene SL at MarineTraffic.com

Maritime incidents in 2011
Merchant ships of Greece
Piracy in Somalia
2004 ships